Bad Karma is a 2001 film directed by John Hough. Patsy Kensit stars as a mental patient who believes she is the reincarnated lover of Jack the Ripper, and that her psychiatrist (Patrick Muldoon) is the reincarnated mass murderer. Damian Chapa and Amy Locane are also in the film, which is adapted by Randall Frakes from the 1997 Douglas Clegg novel of the same name.

Plot
A female mental patient (Patsy Kensit) believing she is the reincarnated soul mate of Jack the Ripper, terrorizes her psychiatrist (Patrick Muldoon), whom she believes is her reincarnated lover. Determined to find her man, and willing to use her sensuality to get to him, she breaks out of the mental institution and is determined to, at any cost, free him of his wife (Amy Locane) and young daughter to restart their previous work as mass murderers, and lovers.

Cast

Production

Filming
The film was released as Hell's Gate in the United States and was filmed on location in Galway, Ireland. The nude scenes of Amy Huberman's character were actually performed by Zoe Paul.

Release

Home media
The film was released on DVD on July 23, 2002, on Region 1 in English.

References

External links

2002 films
2002 thriller films
Films scored by Harry Manfredini
Films set in psychiatric hospitals
Films about reincarnation
Films about Jack the Ripper
Films directed by John Hough
American serial killer films
2000s English-language films
2000s American films